Yvan Moret (born 12 December 1955) is a retired Swiss football defender.

References

1955 births
Living people
Swiss men's footballers
FC Martigny-Sports players
Neuchâtel Xamax FCS players
FC Monthey players
Swiss Super League players
Association football defenders